Khaled Mazeedi is a Kuwaiti media magnate, internet entrepreneur, author, and philanthropist. He gained public attention when he bought an exotic car from a Dubai-based dealership, in 2012 by using only cryptocurrency.

Early life and career
Khaled Mazeedi was born on February 18, 1986, in Kuwait. Mazeedi attended Florida International University and majored in mechanical engineering. He moved to Paris after university to pursue a career in soccer. He played professionally for French clubs AC Arles-Avignon and CS Sedan Ardennes.

In 2020, Mazeedi was listed as the Arab Creator of the Year by Youtuber Prestige awards.

References

Living people
1986 births
People from Kuwait City
21st-century Kuwaiti businesspeople
Kuwaiti YouTubers
Canadian businesspeople
Kuwaiti Muslims
Canadian Muslims
Canadian people of Kuwaiti descent